Poniński (masculine),  Ponińska (feminine) is a Polish surname  derived from the place of Ponin. Notable people of this surname include:
Adam Poniński (1732–1798), Polish nobleman, Prince, Marshal of the Sejm, Deputy Crown Treasurer
Adam Poniński (1758–1816), Polish nobleman, Prince, politician (deputy to Grodno Sejm), soldier and officer
 (1896-1968), Polish diplomat and journalist
 née Ponińska (born 1926) Polish World War II resistance fighter, participant in the Warsaw Uprising

See also

Polish-language surnames
Polish toponymic surnames